The Porta Westfalica, also known as the Westphalian Gap, is a gorge and water gap where the Weser river breaks through the passage between the mountain chains of the Wiehen Hills in the west and the Weser Hills (part of the Weser Uplands) in the east. It is located in the district of Minden-Lübbecke in North Rhine-Westphalia, Germany.

Since 1973, Porta Westfalica is also the name of a town, which was established by merging fifteen villages surrounding the gorge. Since 2006, it is a national geotope.

The name "Porta Westfalica" is a Latin term that means "Gate to Westphalia". Coming from the north, the gorge is the entry to the region of Westphalia. Despite its Latin name, the term was not coined in Roman times, but by scholars in the 19th century.

High above the gorge on the west side is a large six-sided stone structure that can be seen from a considerable distance; this is the Emperor William Monument, erected in honour of Emperor William I of Germany and dedicated in 1896.

References

External links 

Canyons and gorges of Germany
Landforms of North Rhine-Westphalia
Wiehen Hills
Water gaps